Pseudopostega trinidadensis is a moth of the family Opostegidae. It was described by August Busck in 1910. As suggested by its specific epithet, it is known from Trinidad.

Adults have been recorded in June.

References

Opostegidae
Moths described in 1910